Antoinette A. Tordesillas is a professor of applied mathematics at the University of Melbourne, Australia. She heads the Micromechanics of Granular Media Group in the School of Mathematics and Statistics at Melbourne.

Education and career 
Tordesillas attended the University of Adelaide where she majored in applied mathematics and physical and inorganic chemistry, and earned a B.S. in 1986. Her honours thesis in applied mathematics involved the development of a model of the hot-dip galvanising process for creating sheet metal.
She earned her Ph.D. in solid mechanics in 1992 from the University of Wollongong, with a dissertation involving the contact mechanics of roller coating, supervised by James Murray Hill.
After temporary positions at the University of Colorado at Boulder and Kansas State University, she joined the Melbourne department of mathematics and statistics in 1996. She took on a joint position in geomechanics there in 2013, and was promoted to full professor in 2016.

Awards 
Tordesillas was awarded the J H Michell Medal in 2000 by the Australian and New Zealand Industrial and Applied Mathematics Society. This is an annual award for an outstanding new researcher in applied mathematics.

Publications
 Mathematical approaches to cylindrical elastostatic contact problems with applications in roller coating technology, 1992
 Development of micromechanical models for particulate media : the role of mesoscale kinematics and non-affine motion in the transition from particle to bulk mechanical properties, 2006

References

External links
 Antoinette Tordesillas, candidate biography from election for EMI Board of Governors, ASCE, 2016

Year of birth missing (living people)
Living people
Australian mathematicians
Women mathematicians
University of Adelaide alumni
University of Wollongong alumni
Academic staff of the University of Melbourne